The House at 107 William Street in Stoneham, Massachusetts, is a well-preserved early Greek Revival cottage.  Built in the 1820s, it is a -story wood-frame house, five bays wide, with a side-gable roof, clapboard siding, and a granite foundation.  It has a projecting central entry and an ell on its east side, set on a brick foundation.  The ell has a second entry, indicating it may have been used as a shop.  The main entry has sidelights, and both entries have a narrow transom.  It is one of a small number of surviving buildings of a larger cluster that once stood near the junction of William and Main Streets.

The house was listed on the National Register of Historic Places in 1984.

See also
National Register of Historic Places listings in Stoneham, Massachusetts
National Register of Historic Places listings in Middlesex County, Massachusetts

References

Houses on the National Register of Historic Places in Stoneham, Massachusetts
Houses completed in 1825
Houses in Stoneham, Massachusetts